Jammu and Kashmir Administrative Service is the administrative civil service of the Indian union territory of Jammu and Kashmir. The officers for this post are recruited by the Jammu and Kashmir Public Service Commission through an exam which is known as JKAS examination. The statewide combined competitive examination is conducted for recruitment of various state civil service cadres. 

On attempting the number of questions for the JKAS post, the percentage of points are deducted in decimal numbers for each incorrect answer which makes negative marking on the pattern of Union Public Service Commission. The examination is conducted in three phases – a preliminary selection of candidate, consisting of objective-type papers which approves the eligibility of candidates to enter the main examination. The second and main phase consists of a nine question papers of essay type, necessitating candidates in descriptive type answers. and phase-III consists of viva exam pattern, involving the candidates to challenge the Oral exam, intending to judge the mental caliber of a candidate for various subject.

The selected candidates (JKAS officers) take up various administrative posts at the district level such as Sub Divisional Magistrate or Additional Deputy Commissioners and if needed, they are promoted to the IAS officer ranks like District collector (commonly known as Deputy Commissioners) after serving as the KAS officer for a specific period. The promotion process and decisions are made by the Government of Jammu and Kashmir.

History 

The history of Jammu and kashmir Public Service Commission dates back to 1954 when there was no official recruiting agency in the state. It came into existence between 1954–1957, under the section 128 along with the Constitution of J&K State.

Responsibilities of a JKAS  officer 
The JKAS officers (civil administrators) are subdivisions of the government, executing the critical actions in their respective departments as they are working at state or district level. Most of departments in J&K state are either headed by an IAS officer or a JKAS officer. The officers deal with public relations and are responsible to reduce the corruption. The officers are also responsible for internal security affairs at district level, regulating law and order to maintaining peace, and developing infrastructure for all aspects of daily operations in their respectives districts or departments.

References

External links 
 

Jammu and Kashmir civil services
State civil services of India
Government agencies established in 1957
1957 establishments in Jammu and Kashmir
Government of Jammu and Kashmir